Dr. Pramod Pandurang Sawant  (born 24 April 1973) is an Indian politician and Ayurveda Medical Practitioner, who is serving as the 11th and current Chief Minister of Goa since 2019. He represents the Sanquelim constituency in the Goa Legislative Assembly from the Bharatiya Janata Party.Before serving as Chief Minister,he was the speaker in the Goa Legislative Assembly.He Became Chief Minister when the incumbent Chief Minister Manohar Parrikar dies.

Early life and education
Sawant was born on 24 April 1973 to Pandurang and Padmini Sawant. He obtained a Bachelor of Ayurveda, Medicine and Surgery degree from the Ganga Education Society's Ayurvedic Medical College in Kolhapur and a postgraduate degree of Master of Social Work from the Tilak Maharashtra University at Pune.

Political career
Sawant started his electoral career when he contested the 2008 Pale Constituency  by-election on Bharatiya Janta Party ticket and lost to Pratap Prabhakar Gauns of Indian National Congress. He contested the 2012 assembly election from Sanquelim constituency. He won the constituency by 14,255 (66.02%) votes defeating Pratap Prabhakar Gauns of the Indian National Congress. He also served as the spokesperson of the Goa unit of the Bharatiya Janata Party for a brief period of time. Later in 2017 he was re-elected to the Goa Legislative Assembly from the same constituency defeating Dharmesh Saglani of the Indian National Congress with 10,058 (43.04%) votes. On 22 March 2017, he was elected as the Speaker of the Goa Legislative Assembly.

Chief Minister of Goa
After the demise of Manohar Parrikar, the seat of the Chief Minister of Goa fell vacant. Pramod Sawant was elected by the Legislative Assembly afterwards and later he was sworn in as the 13th Chief Minister of Goa on 19 March 2019.

Personal life
Sawant is a Maratha by caste. He is married to Sulakshana, who is a teacher of chemistry at the Shri Shantadurga Higher Secondary School in Bicholim. She is also a leader of the Bharatiya Janata Party and currently the President of the Goa unit of the BJP Mahila Morcha.

See also 
 Pramod Sawant ministry

References 

People from North Goa district
Bharatiya Janata Party politicians from Goa
Goa MLAs 2022–2027
Living people
Goa MLAs 2017–2022
1973 births
Chief Ministers of Goa
Chief ministers from Bharatiya Janata Party
Goa MLAs 2012–2017